Jacqueline Comerre, née Paton (1 May 1859 – 1955) was a French painter and sculptor, and the wife of the painter Léon-François Comerre (1850-1916).

Comerre-Paton was born in Paris. Her mother was Émilie-Thérèse Paton (1820 - 1887), known by the pen of Jacques Rozier, a French novelist and playwright. Her father was economist Jules Paton, financial columnist at the Journal des débats.

Jacqueline studied at the École des Beaux-arts under Alexandre Cabanel. She was friends with portrait painter Fanny Caillé who reproduced one of her most famous paintings, At the spring .

She received an honorable mention in 1881 and a medal at the Versailles exhibition.

Her painting Mistletoe was included in the 1905 book Women Painters of the World.

Comerre-Paton died in Paris.

Selected works 

 The Annunciation
 An ass skin (Donkey skin)
 At the spring
 La chanson des bois 
 Chaperon rouge 
 Faneuse
 L'Ignorance
 Jeune fille aux papillons
 Jeune fille à la source
 Jeune Hollandaise 
 Mignon 
 Mistletoe
 Portrait de Mlle. Marguerite Ugalde 
 Portrait de paysanne 
 Sonioutchka 
 A young beauty
 Young Dutch

References

Footnotes

Sources
Jacqueline Comerre-Paton on artnet

1859 births
1955 deaths
Painters from Paris
French women sculptors
French women painters
19th-century French painters
20th-century French painters
20th-century French sculptors
19th-century French sculptors
19th-century French women artists
20th-century French women artists
École des Beaux-Arts alumni